= James Oldo =

James Oldo or Oldi (Giacomo Oldo, Iacobus de Oldo; c. 1364 – 1404), also known as James of Lodi, was an Italian lay Franciscan and priest from Lombardy, venerated in the Roman Catholic Church as a blessed. A nobleman of considerable means who lived a life of vanity and pleasure in his youth, he underwent a dramatic religious conversion and devoted the remainder of his life to penance, preaching, and the care of the poor.

== Life ==
James Oldo was born around 1364 in Lodi, Lombardy, the son of a wealthy man named Marchesio and his wife Flordonia. In his early years, he was deeply engaged in the cultural and social life of the city. He was known for his musical and artistic abilities—he painted, sang, played the lute, and was regarded as one of the finest dancers in the region. Religion held little interest for him during this period. He married a woman named Catherine, who shared his taste for worldly pleasures.

During a severe outbreak of plague in Lodi, the couple withdrew to the countryside to stay with Catherine’s family. While visiting a local church containing a representation of the Holy Sepulcher, James jokingly lay full-length on a tomb, comparing his height to that of Christ in the image. This moment, however, proved to be a turning point in his life. Overwhelmed internally, he resolved to abandon his former way of life and embrace penance. Around the same time, he had a dream of discovering a treasure hidden beneath a chest, an image later interpreted as foreshadowing his spiritual conversion. He embraced an ascetic routine that included self-discipline, long hours in church, devotional painting, and the care of a sick priest, from whom he learned Latin.

Catherine, influenced by her husband’s transformation and by the deaths of their two daughters during the plague, likewise adopted a penitential lifestyle. The couple took a vow of continence and joined the Third Order of Saint Francis. They converted their home into a chapel, using Catherine’s clothing for vestments and donating her jewelry for liturgical use.

After some years of lay devotion, James was ordained a priest. He formed a circle of followers who lived lives of prayer and charity under his guidance. Tensions with neighboring Franciscan friars, who feared the foundation of a new community, eventually forced him to relocate to the outskirts of Lodi. There, in the suburb of old Lodi, he founded a church dedicated to Saint Julian, where he continued his ministry.

== Death and veneration ==
James Oldo died in 1404 after contracting an illness from a patient he was tending. He was buried in the church he had established, San Giuliano. He was beatified by Pope Pius VII in 1806.

His feast day is commemorated on April 19.

== Hagiographical sources ==
The principal source for the life of James Oldo is a Latin Vita written by his confessor, Bassiano Dardadone, a Franciscan Minorite. The work was begun in 1423 and finalized in 1448. A copy of the original Italian manuscript, preserved in Lodi, was transcribed and authenticated in 1673 by a notary, Arcangelo Portaluppi. This biography was later included in the Acta Sanctorum and used by ecclesiastical authorities to support James’s public cultus. The style of the Vita is considered unpolished and sometimes prolix; editors of the Acta Sanctorum abridged it in translation but retained the author’s structure and principal content. The text recounts James's early life, his sudden religious awakening, the sanctification of his household, and the establishment of charitable works. Later additions documented posthumous miracles and indulgences granted in connection with his cult.

A modern account, B. Giacomo Oldò da Lodi (1933) by P. M. Sevesi, also documents his life and cultus.
